Nery Alexis Veloso Espinoza (born March 1, 1987) is a Chilean football goalkeeper who plays for Segunda División Profesional de Chile club Fernández Vial.

Club career
Veloso made his way through the youth ranks of Huachipato until he was finally called up to the adult side in 2006 and finally making his debut as a professional in 2007 against Melipilla. In the Clausura 2008 tournament in Chile, Veloso took over as Huachipato's first-choice goalkeeper and led the team to the quarterfinals of the playoffs losing to Colo-Colo.  The ANFP awarded Veloso Best Goalkeeper Award at the end of the season. Veloso has since been linked to moves to either Universidad de Chile or Colo-Colo. Finally, it was loaned to Colo-Colo for the 2010 season.

In January 2011, Huachipato loaned Veloso to Unión San Felipe for one year.

In 2023, he joined Fernández Vial in the Segunda División Profesional de Chile.

International career
Veloso was named the back up goalkeeper for Chile at the 2007 FIFA U-20 World Cup.  Veloso did not participate in any of the games of the tournament but Chile won third place at the tournament.  Marcelo Bielsa called Veloso up to the adult side for a friendly versus Honduras in January 2009 but Veloso did not play. In May 2009 Bielsa once again named Veloso as back up goalkeeper for the Kirin Cup in Japan. Due to injuries to regular third string goalkeeper for Chile Christopher Toselli, Veloso was called up again for two 2010 FIFA World Cup qualifiers in June 2009. He made his debut with the Chile national football team in a friendly against Paraguay in Talcahuano winning 2–1.

Honors

Club
Huachipato
 Primera División de Chile (1): 2012 Clausura

International
Chile U20
 FIFA U-20 World Cup third place: 2007

Individual
Best Goalkeeper of Primera División de Chile Award: 2008

References

External links

1987 births
Living people
People from Los Ángeles, Chile
Association football goalkeepers
Chilean footballers
Chile under-20 international footballers
Chile international footballers
C.D. Huachipato footballers
Colo-Colo footballers
Unión San Felipe footballers
Audax Italiano footballers
Unión Española footballers
Santiago Wanderers footballers
San Marcos de Arica footballers
Club Deportivo Palestino footballers
C.D. Arturo Fernández Vial footballers
Chilean Primera División players
Segunda División Profesional de Chile players
Primera B de Chile players